"Cailin" is a song by the San Diego-based rock band Unwritten Law from their 1998 album Unwritten Law. Though it was not released as a single, it became the band's first song to chart, reaching number 28 on Billboard's Modern Rock Tracks chart.

Background
The song is named after singer Scott Russo's daughter, about whom he penned the lyrics.

According to Ex-Guitarist, Rob Brewer, the song was almost not released to radio, as the label wasn’t interested in promoting another single from the album, after three previous ones failed to chart. In an interview with MTV, Brewer explained:"We were kind of expecting the worst. They said, 'We're going to keep you guys, but we're not going to really work the album anymore. We want you to go back and do another one.' And that was kind of a bummer, because we had always thought that 'Cailin' would be a good radio song".

The band's then manager, Bill Silva, then arranged to get the single played on influential West Coast alternative-rock stations, including KROQ-FM, where it quickly became a favorite with listeners.

Personnel

Band
Scott Russo - vocals
Steve Morris - lead guitar
Rob Brewer - rhythm guitar
Wade Youman - drums, percussion

Additional musicians
Micah Albao - bass
Rick Parashar - piano, keyboards, tambura, percussion
Geoff Turner - DJ
Erik Aho - additional guitar

Production
Rick Parashar – producer, engineer, mixing
Jon Plum – assistant producer, engineer, and mixing
Geoff Ott – second engineer
George Marino – mastering

References

1997 songs
Unwritten Law songs
Song recordings produced by Rick Parashar